IQA may refer to:
The International Quidditch Association
The Chartered Quality Institute (CQI), formerly known as The Institute of Quality Assurance (IQA).
The International Quizzing Association.
Image Quality Assessment, the quantitative assessment of image degradation

For the system of Arabic rhythm, see iqa'.